Clay Township is a township in Dunklin County, in the U.S. state of Missouri.

Clay Township most likely has the name of statesman Henry Clay.

References

Townships in Missouri
Townships in Dunklin County, Missouri